The 2018 General Santos Warriors season is the 1st season of the franchise in the Maharlika Pilipinas Basketball League (MPBL).

Key dates
 June 12, 2018: Regular Season Begins.

Current roster

Head coaches

Datu Cup

Standings

Game log

|- style="background:#fcc;"
| 1
| June 12
| Marikina
| L 81–88
| Leomar Losentes (18)
| Delmar Mahaling (15)
| Leomar Losentes (6)
| Smart Araneta Coliseum
| 0–1
|- style="background:#bfb;"
| 2
| June 23
| Imus
| W 79–73
| Leomar Losentes (20)
| Marlon Basco (12)
| 3 Players (4)
| Imus City Sports Complex
| 1–1

|- style="background:#fcc;"
| 3
| July 5
| Quezon City
| L 72–77
| Christopher Masaglang (18)
| Delmar Mahaling (12)
| Christopher Masaglang (5)
| Blue Eagle Gym
| 1–2
|- style="background:#fcc;"
| 4
| July 18
| Bataan
| L 58–62
| 
| 
| 
| Bataan People's Center
| 1–3
|- style="background:#fcc;"
| 5
| July 31
| Makati
| L 71–86
| 
| 
| 
| Ynares Center
| 1–4

|- style="background:#bfb;"
| 6
| August 23
| Cebu City
| W 70–66
|
|
|
|
| 2–4

|- style="background:#bfb;"
| 7
| September 1
| Pampanga
| W 72–64
|
|
|
| Lagao Gymnasium
| 3–4
|- style="background:#;"
| 8
|
| Bulacan
|
|
|
|
|
|

|- style="background:#;"
| 9
|
|
|
|
|
|
|
|
|- style="background:#;"
| 10
|
|
|
|
|
|
|
|
|- style="background:#;"
| 11
|
|
|
|
|
|
|
|
|- style="background:#;"
| 12
|
|
|
|
|
|
|
|
|- style="background:#;"
| 13
|
|
|
|
|
|
|
|
|- style="background:#;"
| 14
|
|
|
|
|
|
|
|
|- style="background:#;"
| 15
|
|
|
|
|
|
|
|
|- style="background:#;"
| 16
|
|
|
|
|
|
|
|
|- style="background:#;"
| 17
|
|
|
|
|
|
|
|
|- style="background:#;"
| 18
|
|
|
|
|
|
|
|
|- style="background:#;"
| 19
|
|
|
|
|
|
|
|
|- style="background:#;"
| 20
|
|
|
|
|
|
|
|
|- style="background:#;"
| 21
|
|
|
|
|
|
|
|
|- style="background:#;"
| 22
|
|
|
|
|
|
|
|
|- style="background:#;"
| 23
|
|
|
|
|
|
|
|
|- style="background:#;"
| 24
|
|
|
|
|
|
|
|
|- style="background:#;"
| 25
|
|
|
|
|
|
|
|

Playoffs

Bracket

References

General Santos Warriors
General Santos Warriors Season, 2018